Symbol of Salvation is the fourth album by American heavy metal band Armored Saint, released in 1991 on Metal Blade Records. It was their first release with guitarist Jeff Duncan and their last album before going on an extended hiatus that would last until 1999. The songs on this album were written and demoed in 1988 and 1989 with original guitarist Dave Prichard (except "Truth Always Hurts"), who died of leukemia in 1990 prior to recording. The first guitar solo on "Tainted Past" was lifted from a 1989 4-track demo recorded by Prichard. The album was produced by Dave Jerden, who had produced Alice in Chains and Jane's Addiction albums beforehand. Jerden would go on to produce vocalist John Bush's first album with Anthrax, Sound of White Noise in 1993.

The track "Hanging Judge" was featured in the 1992 horror film Hellraiser III: Hell on Earth, which also featured a cameo appearance of Armored Saint in a nightclub scene.

Reception
In 2005, Symbol of Salvation was ranked number 424 in Rock Hard magazine's book of The 500 Greatest Rock & Metal Albums of All Time.

Track listing

2003 reissue
In 2003, Metal Blade Records remastered and re-released the album as a three-disc special edition. In addition to the full 13-song track list, the first disc contains the music videos to "Reign of Fire" and "Last Train Home". The second disc contains the original 1989 four-track demos (the same demos that the solo of "Tainted Past" came from) of every song from the album (except the instrumental "Half Drawn Bridge"), all which feature original guitarist Dave Prichard. The remainder of the second disc is the first half of a retrospective interview with the band and Metal Blade CEO Brian Slagel, and the third disc contains the second half of the same interview.

Personnel

John Bush – lead vocals
Phil Sandoval – lead guitar
Jeff Duncan – lead guitar, backing vocals
Joey Vera – bass, backing vocals
Gonzo Sandoval – drums, percussion
Dave Prichard – first guitar solo on "Tainted Past"

Solos
1. 1st solo: Phil; 2nd solo: Jeff.
2. 1st solo: Phil; 2nd solo: Jeff.
3. solos: Jeff.
4. 1st solo: Phil; 2nd solo: Jeff.
5. 1st solo: Phil; 2nd solo: Jeff.
6. 1st solo: Phil; 2nd solo: Jeff.
7. 1st solo: Phil; 2nd solo: Jeff.
8. 1st solo: Jeff; 2nd solo: Phil.
9. solos: Jeff.
10. 1st solo: Jeff; 2nd solo: Phil.
11. 1st solo: Jeff; 2nd solo: Phil.
12. 1st solo: D. Prichard; 2nd solo: Phil.
13. 1st solo: Jeff; 2nd solo: Phil.

References

External links 
Official Armored Saint website
[ Armored Saint] on AllMusic
Armored Saint's Symbol of Salvation on Encyclopaedia Metallum

1991 albums
Armored Saint albums
albums produced by Dave Jerden
Metal Blade Records albums